"Pana" is a song recorded by Nigerian singer-songwriter Tekno, which was released in July 22, 2016, by Made Men Music Group, it was written by Tekno and  produced by Krizbeatz. 
The song received mostly positive reviews from music critics and tops the MTV Base's hottest track of 2016 at number 2, it also debuted at the top 10 Soundcity TV count down.

"Pana" won song of the year award at the 2016 Soundcity MVP Awards Festival and was nominated at the 2017 Nigeria Entertainment Awards for Best Single of the year.

Background and reception

Krizbeatz revealed that the beat produced for "Pana" was not originally for Tekno. The song is characterized as an Afropop song with elements of R&B.
OkayAfrica included the song in the 10 Best Nigerian Songs of 2016 and describe it as a slow soother, much like "Duro" and "Diana"

Commercial performance
The song became a continental hit and was the second most searched Nigerian song on Google in 2016. It also charted at number one on Apple Music in several countries including Nigeria, Kenya and Ghana and it went on to become Tekno's most popular record with over 50 million Spotify streams as of April 2022.

Music video 
The music video was released on 22 August 2016, directed by Clarence Peters. It became the third music video by a Nigerian artiste to surpass the 100 million views milestone on Youtube, and the top five most viewed Nigerian music video of all time as of 2021.

Release history

Awards and nominations

References

2016 songs
2016 singles
Nigerian afropop songs